is a former head coach of the Takamatsu Five Arrows in the Japanese Bj League.

Head coaching record

|-
| style="text-align:left;"|Takamatsu Five Arrows
| style="text-align:left;"|2015
| 26||7||19|||| style="text-align:center;"|Fired|||-||-||-||
| style="text-align:center;"|- 
|-

References

1974 births
Living people

Japanese basketball coaches

Kagawa Five Arrows coaches